Jaan Vaher (1871–?) was an Estonian politician. He was a member of II Riigikogu. He was a member of the Riigikogu since 17 May 1924, representing the Workers' United Front. He replaced Aleksander Liiber. On 4 June 1924, he resigned his position and he was replaced by Eduard Brok.

References

1871 births
Year of death missing
Workers' United Front politicians
Members of the Riigikogu, 1923–1926